Yellow Quill 90-8 is an Indian reserve of the Yellow Quill First Nation in Saskatchewan. It is 27 kilometres north of Kelvington.

References

Indian reserves in Saskatchewan